Cyclonaias pustulosa, the pimpleback, is a species of freshwater mussel, an aquatic bivalve mollusk in the family Unionidae, the river mussels. This species is native to North America, where it is widespread and common.  It has possibly been extirpated from New York, however, and populations in Pennsylvania are critically imperiled, according to NatureServe.

The species was formerly classified within the genus Quadrula, and in 2012 it was moved to Rotundaria based on genetic evidence.

References

Williams, J. D.; Bogan, A. E.; Garner, J. T. (2008). Freshwater mussels of Alabama and the Mobile Basin in Georgia, Mississippi and Tennessee. University of Alabama Press, Tuscaloosa. 908 pp.

Unionidae
Molluscs of North America
Fauna of the Great Lakes region (North America)
Fauna of the Southeastern United States
Bivalves described in 1831